The Philippines–Thailand Friendship Circle is a traffic circle in Santa Ana, Manila in the Philippines, located at the intersection of Jose Syquia, M. Roxas, Revellin, and Zamora Streets, near the Santa Ana Public Market.

Originally unnamed (residents of Santa Ana simply called it the "Rotonda", and still do today), the circle was given its present name by virtue of Ordinance No. 7964, authored by Councilor Luciano "Lou" Veloso and passed in 1999, as a reciprocal gesture after a street in Bangkok was named "Soi Philippines" the year before.  While initially inaugurated during the visit of Prime Minister Chuan Leekpai to the Philippines that year, renovation works on the circle would not be complete until 2002.

The circle was re-inaugurated on March 30, 2009 by Mayor Alfredo Lim, in commemoration of sixty years of Philippines–Thailand relations.

Architecture
The Philippines–Thailand Friendship Circle contains a  artificial waterfall, a nipa hut, an orchidarium, statues, a performance area and a bonsai garden. At the center is a monument named the Angel of Unity, commemorating the relationship between the two countries.

References

External links

Landmarks in the Philippines
Roundabouts and traffic circles in the Philippines
Roads in Metro Manila
Buildings and structures in Santa Ana, Manila
Philippines–Thailand relations